CrossTalk is a current affairs debate television program on RT. Billed as the flagship program of the network, it is hosted by American journalist Peter Lavelle from RT's studios in Moscow. It is dedicated to discussions on global affairs, with Lavelle moderating conversation between several guests.

The show was created by Lavelle who previously hosted IMHO and In Context for RT. It also featured input from Yelena Khanga who provided the background story on the topic of discussion for the day. CrossTalk premiered on September 30, 2009 and airs for 30 minutes. Guests are encouraged to intervene whenever they wish which, according to Oliver Bullough in the New Statesman, means the conversation can "degrade into barely comprehensible shouting".

Editions and responses
In a 2010 episode of CrossTalk, Lavelle's two guests — Douglas Murray of the Centre for Social Cohesion and Anne-Elisabeth Moutet of the Rousseau Institute — were taken aback when he said that the perpetrators of the September 11 attacks were "not fundamentalists". Lavelle later said this particular episode was a "fiasco" because he lacked a "balanced pair of experts".

An edition in July 2016 was a response to a NATO summit in which all participants were critical of the alliance. One participant said NATO was "a minute group of megalomaniac powerbrokers hell bent on sending us into a third world war". According to Lavelle, he had been prevented from showing a defence of NATO in captions because of technical problems, although anti-NATO captions were shown. Dominic Kennedy in The Times of London reported in August 2016 that the programme has conveyed conspiracy theories that the September 11 attacks were an inside job and AIDS being caused by AIDS drugs themselves.

References

External links
 Official site

2009 American television series debuts
2000s American television series
2010s American television series
2020s American television series
RT (TV network) original programming